Palazzo Comunale (also called Palazzo Gotico) is a palace in Piacenza, northern Italy which now serves as the seat of municipal administration.

History 
The palace is located in the city of Piacenza, in Northern Italy, on the banks of the River Po. In 1281, the ghibellin Alberto Scoto, wanted to build the palace and sent for four architects from Piacenza: Pietro da Cagnano, Negro De Negri, Gherardo Bellman and Pietro da Borghetto.

Following the first project, the palace should have been quadrangular, but work was stopped due to an epidemic plague. Only the north side of the palace was finished. The result is an excellent example of civil ogive architecture in lombard Gothic style.
 
Inside there is a large lounge which, in 1644, became a theatre, to a design by Cristoforo Rangon.

See also 
 Palazzo Farnese, Piacenza

References

External links

Comunale
Comunale
Art museums and galleries in Emilia-Romagna
City and town halls in Italy